This list of house styles lists styles of vernacular architecture used in the design of houses.

African

Asian

South American

Mediterranean, Spanish, Italian

Neoclassical

Elizabethan and Tudor

Colonial

French and Canadian

Victorian and Queen Anne

American

Indian

Modern and Post-modern

See also 

 List of architectural styles

References 

 
House styles, List of